Jean-Michel Leniaud (18 August 1951, Toulon) is a French historian of art. A specialist of architecture and art of the 19th and 20th centuries, he was director of the École Nationale des Chartes from 2011 to 2016.
He is president of the Société des Amis de Notre-Dame de Paris.

Publications 
1980: Jean-Baptiste Lassus, 1807-1857 ou Le Temps retrouvé des cathédrales, Arts et métiers graphiques, (thesis for the archivist palaeographer diploma) 
1988: L'Administration des cultes pendant la période concordataire, Nouvelles éditions latines, 1988 
1989: Introduction aux Mémoires de l'abbé Grégoire, Santé, 
1989: La Culture des sans-culottes, Paris-Presses du Languedoc, (with ) 
1991: La Sainte-Chapelle, Nathan-Caisse nationale des monuments historiques et des sites, (with Françoise Perrot) 
1992: L'Utopie française : essai sur le patrimoine, Mengès, (pref. Marc Fumaroli) 
1993: Les Cathédrales au XIXe : étude du service des édifices diocésains, Economica-Caisse nationale des monuments historiques et des sites, 
1993 Ces églises du XIXe, Encrage, 1993 (avec Chantal Bouchon, Catherine Brisac et Nadine Chaline) 
1994: Répertoire des architectes diocésains du XIXe, Economica,(Read online)
1994: Viollet-le-Duc ou Les Délires du système, Mengès, 
1996: Saint-Denis, de 1760 à nos jours, Gallimard-Julliard, 
1998: Les Bâtisseurs d'avenir : portraits d'architectes : : XIXe-XXe siècle : Fontaine, Viollet-le-Duc, Hankar, Horta, Guimard, Tony Garnier, Le Corbusier, Fayard 
2001: L'Hôtel de la préfecture et du conseil général des Yvelines, Versailles, Association pour le patrimoine d'Île-de-France (with Nicole de Blic, ill. Daniel Balloud) 
2001: Chroniques patrimoniales, Norma, 
2001: Les Périodiques d'architecture, XVIIIe-XIXe siècle : recherche d'une méthode critique d'analyse, École des chartes, 2001 (dir. avec Béatrice Bouvier)  
2001 Le Livre d'architecture : XVe-XXe siècle : édition, représentations et bibliothèques, École des chartes, (dir. with Béatrice Bouvier)  
2002: Des palais pour les livres : Labrouste, Sainte-Geneviève et les bibliothèque, Maisonneuve et Larose-bibliothèque Sainte-Geneviève, dir. (av.-propos Nathalie Jullian) 
2002: Fallait-il achever Saint-Ouen de Rouen ? : débats et polémiques, 1837-1852, ASI, 
2002: Les Archipels du passé : le patrimoine et son histoire, Fayard,  
2003: Architecture, institutions et services publics, École pratique des hautes études ed.
2003: Charles Garnier, Monum-Le Patrimoine, (ill. Thierry Béghin) 
2004: Les Rivieras de Charles Garnier et Gustave Eiffel : le rêve de la raison, Imbernon, (en coll.) 
2005: Entre nostalgie et utopie : réalités architecturales et artistiques aux XIXe et XXe, École des chartes, (dir.) 
2005: Historiographie de l’histoire de l’art religieux en France à l’époque moderne et contemporaine : bilan bibliographique (1975-2000) et perspectives, (dir. with Isabelle Saint-Martin) 
2005: Le Palais de l'Institut : du collège des Quatre-Nations à l'Institut de France : 1895-2005, Nicolas Chaudun, (en coll.) 
2006: Notre-Dame de Chartres, Molière, 2006 
2007: La Révolution des signes : l'art à l'église, 1830-1930, Le Cerf, 
2007: Vingt siècles d'architecture religieuse en France, SCEREN-CNDP,
2007: La Sainte-Chapelle, Le Patrimoine-Centre des monuments nationaux, (with Françoise Perrot)  (also published in English)
2007: Le Budget des cultes, École des chartes, (dir.) 
2008: Notre-Dame de Paris, Molière, 
2009: L’Art nouveau, Citadelles et Mazenod,   (translated into German and Russian)
2010:  (also published in German)
2012: La Basilique royale de Saint-Denis : de Napoléon à la République, Picard, Paris,  
2012: La Basilique Saint-Denis, Le Patrimoine-Centre des monuments nationaux, Paris, (with Philippe Plagnieux)  
2012: Napoléon et les Arts, Citadelles et Mazenod, Paris,  
2013: Droit de cité pour le patrimoine, Presses de l'université du Québec, Montréal, 303 p. 
2014: Viollet-le-Duc : les visions d'un architecte (dir. avec Laurence de Finance), Norma,  
2015: La Transmission familiale de l'esprit de service (dir. avec Pierre Jaillard et Éric Peuchot), Paris, Tallandier, 183 p.  
2015: Les Fastes de la trompe (dir. with Jean-Pierre Chaline), Paris, Tallandier, 191 p.

Honours

Decorations 
 Officier de la Légion d'honneur
 Officier de l'ordre national du Mérite
 Commandeur of the Ordre des Palmes académiques
 Commandeur of the Ordre des Arts et des Lettres

Prizes 
 Prix Chaix-d'Est-Ange de l'Académie des sciences morales et politiques et prix d'histoire de l'architecture de l'ordre des architectes d'Île-de-France pour Les Cathédrales au XIXe (1993)
 Médailles d'argent du prix Eugène-Carrière de l'Académie française for Les Bâtisseurs d'avenir (1998) and Charles Garnier (2003)
 Prix Bernier de l’Académie des beaux-arts for Les Rivieras de Charles Garnier et Gustave Eiffel (2007)
 Prix Houllevigue de l'Académie des beaux-arts for L'Art nouveau (2009)

References

External links 
 Fiche sur enc-sorbonne.fr

20th-century French historians
21st-century French historians
French art historians
École Nationale des Chartes alumni
Academic staff of the École Nationale des Chartes
École pratique des hautes études alumni
Officiers of the Légion d'honneur
Officers of the Ordre national du Mérite
Commandeurs of the Ordre des Palmes Académiques
Commandeurs of the Ordre des Arts et des Lettres
Writers from Toulon
1951 births
Living people